"Follow Me Up to Carlow" is an Irish folk song celebrating the defeat of an army of 3,000 English soldiers by Fiach Mac Aodh Ó Broin (anglicised Fiach MacHugh O'Byrne) at the Battle of Glenmalure, during the Second Desmond Rebellion in 1580.

Composition

The air is reputed to have been played as a marching tune by the pipers of Fiach MacHugh O'Byrne in 1580.

The words were written by Patrick Joseph McCall (1861–1919) and appear in his Songs of Erinn (1899) under the title "Marching Song of Feagh MacHugh".

Performances

It has been performed by numerous Irish folk bands. Most notably, Planxty recorded it on their debut album.

It was also performed by the Wolfe Tones in their debut album Foggy Dew in 1965.

It was performed by Jim McCann on his album, Jim McCann in 1980 

An adapted version of the song was performed by the Young Dubliners, a Celtic rock band.  It can be found on their albums Breathe, Alive Alive O (live), and With All Due Respect – The Irish Sessions.

A Polish version of the song ("Do Carlow") was recorded by the band Mordewind and can be found on their second album, "Defaac'to".

Declan Hunt, an Irish Balladeer, covered the song in his album "26 Irish Rebel Songs — (Volume Two)".

The song was performed by the Spanish band Los Stompers as part of their live album "Mezzy on Stage".

Blood or Whiskey, an Irish punk/folk band from Leixlip, County Kildare, recorded it on their album "No Time To Explain".

James Keelaghan performs versions on his debut album "Timelines" and again with Oscar Lopez on "Compadres".

Cruachan, an Irish folk metal group, plays their version on the album "Blood for the Blood God" titled "The Marching Song of Fiach Mac Hugh".

Fiddler's Green, a German folk rock band, adapted the lyrics into their song "I Won't Follow You Up To Carlow" on their album Black Sheep.

The High Kings, an Irish Folk Group, recorded a version of the song on their 2016 album "Grace & Glory".

Distant Oaks recorded this song on their 1996 album "Empty Your Heart of its Mortal Dream".

The song has also been recorded by Quilty, a Swedish band who perform Irish folk songs.

In 2016 the song was recorded by The Jacobites by Name on their self titled first album.

The Tan and Sober Gentlemen, a Scotch-Irish hillbilly band from North Carolina, included a version on their debut record, "Veracity."

See also
 O'Donnell Abu

References

External links
 Sheet music
 "Follow Me up to Carlow" - Planxty

Irish folk songs
1899 songs
Songs written by Patrick Joseph McCall
Second Desmond Rebellion
Songs about Ireland